Jamel may refer to:

 Jamel, Tunisia, a city in Tunisia
 Jamel, Germany, a village in Germany

People with the given name Jamel
 Jamel Aït Ben Idir (born 1984) French-Moroccan footballer
 Jamel Dean (born 1996), American football player
 Jamel Debbouze (born 1975), French actor
 Jamel Holley (born 1979), American politician
 Jamel McLean (born 1988), American basketball player
 Temetrius Jamel Morant (born 1999), American basketball player
 Jamel Phillips (born 1989), birth name of American rapper ASAP Twelvyy
 Jamel Richardson (born 1982), American football player